Lorris Murail (9 June 1951 – 3 August 2021) was a French children's author. He specialized in the science fiction genre and was also a literary critic, translator and journalist.

Biography
Murail studied at Sciences Po and had been writing since the age of 16. He was the son of poet  and journalist Marie-Thérèse Barrois, and the brother of composer Tristan Murail, writer Marie-Aude Murail, and writer Elvire Murail. In 2021, he wrote two detective novels: Angie ! and Souviens-toi de septembre !

Murail died on Chamadelle on 3 August 2021 at the age of 70.

Works

Youth novels
Le Cirque Manzano (1991)
Le Professeur de distractions (1993)
L'Ancêtre disparue (1994)
La Dernière Valse (1995)
La Course aux records (1996)
Qui c'est celui-là ? (1998)
Le Petit Cirque des horreurs (1999)
Les Pommes Chatouillard du chef (2000)
Ma Chambre, mon lit, ma mère et moi (2003)
Le Voyage d'Ulysse (2005)
Même pas en rêve (2005)
Flash mob (2005)
Foule sentimentale (2005)
Panique en cuisine (2006)
La Guerre de Troie (2007)
Les Semelles de bois (2007)
Un méchant petit diable (2007)
Le Maléfice égyptien (2007)
Ce que disent les nuages : roman (2009)
Ne répète jamais ça ! (2009)
Reality girl : roman (2010)
L'inconnu de l'île Mathis (2011)
Shanoé (2014)
Lundi, couscous (2014)
Douze ans, sept mois et onze jours (2015)
Rien ni personne (2017)
Chaque chose en son temps (2018)
L'horloge de l'Apocalypse (2018)
Vampyre (2019)
Soleil trouble (2020)

Youth series
Dan Martin enquête
Dan Martin, détective (1994)
Coup de blues pour Dan Martin (1996)
Dan Martin fait son cinéma (1998)
Dan Martin file à l'anglaise (1999)
Le Chartreux de Pam (1999)
Les Cornes d'ivoire
Afirik - Petite sœur blanche (2011)
Septentrion - La ballade du continent perdu (2012)
Celle qui lève le vent (2014)

Comics
Le Journal de Carmilla
Reproduction interdite (2006)
Une espèce en voie de disparition (2007)
Compensé carbone (2008)
Delphinothérapie (2009)
Les enquêtes surnaturelles de Mina
Descente aux Enfers ! (2011)

Adult novels
Omnyle (1975)
L'Hippocampe (1981)
La Grande Roue (1982)
Blanche-Ébène (1985)
Le Tombeau de Ridge (1990)
La Méthode albanaise (1996)
Guide Totem de la science-fiction (1999)
Nuigrave (2009)
Urbik, Orbik (2011)

References

1951 births
2021 deaths
Writers from Le Havre
Sciences Po alumni